Alliance College was an independent, liberal arts college located in Cambridge Springs, Pennsylvania, offering a special program in Polish and Slavic languages (cf Slavistics).  It was originally an academy at the high school level.  In the 1920s it added a junior college degree.  From 1948 until its closing in 1987, the college was an accredited four-year co-educational liberal arts institution. Student matriculation peaked at 629 in 1968, but was usually much lower.

History
The school was founded by the Polish National Alliance (PNA) in 1912 "to provide opportunities for Americans of Polish descent to learn about the mother country, its culture, history, and language."  Classes were usually taught in English. It was nationally famous for its Kujawiaki folk dance ensemble. It also operated  exchange programs with Jagiellonian University in Kraków, Poland.

Following the college's closure, the campus was sold in 1990 to the Commonwealth of Pennsylvania, which in 1992 opened State Correctional Institution (SCI) – Cambridge Springs, a minimum-security women's prison, at the site.

Polish collection

Alliance College's library housed the largest Polish collection (35,000 cataloged and 15,000 uncataloged volumes) in North America.  The collection was donated by the PNA to the University of Pittsburgh in 1991.

Transcripts

The office of the registrar at Mercyhurst College in Erie, Pennsylvania, is the designated agent for storing and retrieving Alliance College transcripts.

Athletics

The school's sports teams were called the Eagles. According to College Football Data Warehouse, Alliance College played football only sporadically until after World War II.  In four seasons after the war, Alliance compiled a 12–21 record.  The 1948 team enjoyed a winning season.  After losses to St. Francis (PA), St. Vincent (PA), Duquesne (PA), and Juniata (PA), the Eagles rebounded with five straight wins over Brockport State (NY), Lock Haven State (PA), Clarion (PA), Edinboro (PA), and Steubenville (OH).  The Eagles won only one game in 1949 before dropping football in March 1950.

References

Further reading
 Urbanski, Michael T.  "Polite Avoidance: The Story Behind the Closing of Alliance College," Polish American Studies (Spring 2009), Vol. 66 Issue 1, p25-42

External links

Alliance College Alumni Association
Alliance College Polish Collection
Penna. Department of Corrections - SCI Cambridge Springs

Polish-American culture in Pennsylvania
Educational institutions established in 1912
Defunct private universities and colleges in Pennsylvania
Education in Crawford County, Pennsylvania
Buildings and structures in Crawford County, Pennsylvania
Educational institutions disestablished in 1987
Polish-American history
1912 establishments in Pennsylvania
Liberal arts colleges in Pennsylvania